"Bow Down Mister" is a song written by English singer Boy George, under the pseudonym "Angela Dust", and recorded by his first musical group following his departure from Culture Club, Jesus Loves You. Inspired by a trip George took to India, the song is a tribute to the Hare Krishna movement and incorporates the Hare Krishna mantra. Indian singer Asha Bhosle performs the female vocals on the song but is uncredited on the single release.

"Bow Down Mister" was released on 11 February 1991 as the fourth single from the project's only studio album, The Martyr Mantras (1991). It reached number 27 on the UK Singles Chart and became a bigger hit in several mainland European countries, especially in Austria and Germany, where the song reached the top 10.

Background and meaning
Boy George wrote "Bow Down Mister" shortly after taking a trip to India. George was intrigued that the song was perceived as radical to the public, as this was not his intention; however, he went on to explain, "That is unless you consider a song that encourages love instead of hate as being radical. I am continually amazed at how, with all of the knowledge we have as humans, we continue to be so small-minded." The track was written as an ode to the Hare Krishna movement, a Hindu religious organisation whose members dedicate their thoughts and actions to the Hindu deity Krishna, and the song recites the Hare Krishna mantra several times during the bridge. Indian playback singer Asha Bhosle is featured as the female vocalist on the recording. During an interview, Bhosle stated that "Bow Down Mister" was the best song she had contributed to and that she continues to cherish it.

Critical reception
Billboard writer Larry Flick called the song "thoroughly original and refreshing" and praised its "anthemic" melody but found the song "too offbeat" for UK hit radio. In the same magazine, a review of the parent album called the homage "quirky". AllMusic reviewer William Ruhlmann referred to "Bow Down Mister" as one of the "oddest" songs on The Martyr Mantras. Chris Mellor from Record Mirror noted, "Indian dance music, hippy chic George Harrison style Hare Krishna chants mingle with beautiful sitars and Boy George's inimitable vocal style to create something quite stunning." Another editor, Phil Cheeseman felt that it has "a terrible line [...] about Hindus knowing the score, not enormously subtle given the current flare-up of religious and caste violence in India."

Chart performance
On the UK Singles Chart, "Bow Down Mister" debuted at number 69 on 17 February 1991, taking a total of five weeks to peak at number 27 on 17 March 1991. It spent three more weeks in the top 100 before dropping out in early April. The same month, the track appeared on the French Singles Chart at number 41, rising to a peak of number 29 on two occasions and spending 13 weeks on the chart. In late May, the single entered the Austrian and German Singles Chart. In Austria, it rose to number two and totalled 22 weeks in the top 30, ending 1991 as the country's 10th-highest-selling single. Meanwhile, in Germany, it peaked at number six for two weeks, logged 27 weeks in the top 100, and finished the year at number 17 on Germany's year-end chart. In Switzerland, it reached number 15, while in the Flanders region of Belgium, it debuted at its peak of number 44. On the Eurochart Hot 100, "Bow Down Mister" rose to number 20 in August 1991 and was ranked Europe's 73rd-best-performing hit of the year.

Track listings
 UK 12-inch single
A. "Bow Down Mister" (Sitari Bizzari Mix) – 6:24
B. "Bow Down Mister" (Floating in the Ganges – Grid Mix) – 7:04

 French maxi-single
 "Bow Down Mister" (A Small Portion 2 B Polite Mix) – 3:59
 "Bow Down Mister" (Nayana Banana Govinda Goulash Mix) – 6:25
 "Love Hurts" (Yes It Doz U Blighter Mix) – 3:59

 German 7-inch single
A. "Bow Down Mister" (A Small Portion 2B Polite Mix) – 3:59
B. "Love Hurts" (Yes It Doz U Blighter Mix) – 3:59

Charts

Weekly charts

Year-end charts

References

1990 songs
1991 singles
Asha Bhosle songs
Boy George songs
British house music songs
Bhajan
Indian mythology in music
Krishna in popular culture
Macaronic songs
Songs about India
Songs written by Boy George
Virgin Records singles
Hindu devotional songs